is the name of a Japanese clothing brand created in 1988 by Akinori Isobe and his wife, Fumiyo. Baby, The Stars Shine Bright specializes in Lolita fashion. The company's flagship store, opened in 1999 in Daikanyamachō, Shibuya, was relocated to Omotesandō in 2012. The company produced the wardrobe for a main character in the 2004 film Kamikaze Girls. International store locations include San Francisco.

See also 
 Novala Takemoto

References

External links 
  

Clothing retailers of Japan
Lolita fashion
Retail companies established in 1988
1988 establishments in Japan

ja:ゴスロリブランド一覧#Baby, The Stars Shine Bright